Bayner Blackwell (Multiple names were used including Jim Blackledge and M. Blackleg) was an African-American man who was lynched in Swansboro, Onslow County, North Carolina by a group of men on August 6, 1922. According to the United States Senate Committee on the Judiciary it was the 44th of 61 lynchings during 1922 in the United States.

Background

After completing his rural mail run in Swansboro, Cy Jones, (The name Cyrus Long  was also used in the newspapers) headed to his home in Maysville, North Carolina around 7:00 PM. Under an hour later his car was found back in Swansboro. In the vehicle, Jones was unconscious, with a gunshot wound to the head. Investigators were able to track down the location of the attack, noting that a mighty struggle must have taken place as there were many broken branches.  Jones would later die of his injuries.
 
The Phoenix Tribune reported that the African-American community claimed that the attackers of Cy Jones were actually whites in blackface who then reported the attack as a Black gang beating  Cy Jones.

Lynching 

A mob quickly gathered as word of the attack on Cy Jones spread. They began hunting for Blackwell and terrorizing the local Black community. As many as five Black families left their homes in Swansboro due to anti-Black actions.

Sheriff Gurgenus of Onslow County, North Carolina stated that Blackwell was not lynched, rather he was chased out of town. The Sheriff claimed that a white mob visited Bayner Blackwell's house, on August 12, 1922, and told him to leave town.

National memorial 

The National Memorial for Peace and Justice opened in Montgomery, Alabama, on April 26, 2018. Featured among other things is the Memorial Corridor which displays 805 hanging steel rectangles, each representing the counties in the United States where a documented lynching took place and, for each county, the names of those lynched. The memorial hopes that communities, like Onslow County, North Carolina where Bayner Blackwell was lynched, will take these slabs and install them in their own communities.

See also

Oscar Mack was reportedly lynched on July 18, 1922, but actually escaped to another State and lived under a new name.

References 
Notes

Bibliography 

 

1922 riots
1922 in North Carolina
African-American history of North Carolina
Lynching deaths in North Carolina
February 1922 events
Protest-related deaths
Racially motivated violence against African Americans 
Riots and civil disorder in North Carolina
White American riots in the United States
Onslow County, North Carolina